The One Hundred Sixteenth Ohio General Assembly was the legislative body of the state of Ohio in 1985 and 1986. In this General Assembly, the Ohio Senate was controlled by the Republican Party and the Ohio House of Representatives was controlled by the Democratic Party.  In the Senate, there were 18 Republicans and 15 Democrats.  In the House, there were 58 Democrats and 41 Republicans.

Major events

Vacancies
February 5, 1985: Senator Tom Walsh (R-29th) resigns.
November 15, 1985: Representative Bob Brown (R-5th) resigns.
January 8, 1986: Representative Ed Ortlett (D-37th) resigns.
March 4, 1986: Representative Bob Nettle (D-41st) resigns.
October 16, 1986: Representative John Thomson (D-16th) dies.

Appointments
February 5, 1985: Scott Oeslager is appointed to the 29th Senatorial District.
November 15, 1985: Randy Gardner is appointed to the 5th House District.
January 8, 1986: Tom Roberts is appointed to the 37th House District.
November 16, 1986: Vermel Whalen is appointed to the 16th House District.
May 21, 1986: Tom Seese is appointed to the 41st House District.

Senate

Leadership

Majority leadership
 President of the Senate: Paul Gillmor
 President pro tempore of the Senate: Stanley Aronoff
 Assistant pro tempore: Paul Pfeifer
 Whip: Richard Finan

Minority leadership
 Leader: Harry Meshel
 Assistant Leader: Neal Zimmers
 Whip: Charles Butts
 Assistant Whip: Tom Carney

Members of the 116th Ohio Senate

House of Representatives

Leadership

Majority leadership
 Speaker of the House: Vern Riffe
 President pro tempore of the Senate: Barney Quilter
 Floor Leader: Bill Mallory
 Assistant Majority Floor Leader: Vernon Cook
 Majority Whip: Patrick Sweeney

Minority leadership
 Leader: Corwin Nixon
 Assistant Leader: Waldo Rose
 Whip: Dave Johnson

Members of the 116th Ohio House of Representatives

Appt.- Member was appointed to current House Seat

See also
Ohio House of Representatives membership, 126th General Assembly
Ohio House of Representatives membership, 125th General Assembly
 List of Ohio state legislatures

References
Ohio House of Representatives official website
Project Vote Smart – State House of Ohio
Map of Ohio House Districts
Ohio District Maps 2002–2012
2006 election results from Ohio Secretary of State

Ohio legislative sessions
Ohio
Ohio
1985 in Ohio
1986 in Ohio